The 1940 New Mexico Lobos football team represented the University of New Mexico as a member of the Border Conference during the 1940 college football season. In their fourth season under head coach Ted Shipkey, the Lobos compiled an overall record of 5–4 with a mark of 4–2 against conference opponents, finished fourth in the Border Conference, and outscored all opponents by a total of 167 to 96. After compiling a 1–4 record in the first six games, the team won its final four games, including victories over rivals New Mexico Agricultural and Arizona and an upset victory over previously undefeated and No. 18-ranked Texas Tech.

Three New Mexico players were selected as first-team players on the All-Border Conference football team selected by the Albuquerque Journal: halfback Avery Monfort; tackle Austin O'Jibway; and guard Wilbur Gentry. Gentry was named captain of the all-conference team. Halfback Jack Morrissey and guard Luksich were placed on the team.

Schedule

References

New Mexico
New Mexico Lobos football seasons
New Mexico Lobos football